Mejdell is a surname. Notable people with the surname include:

Dag Mejdell (born 1957), Norwegian businessperson and chief executive officer of Posten Norge
Glør Thorvald Mejdell (1851–1937), Norwegian barrister, judge, and political writer
Johan Ernst Mejdell (1773–?), Norwegian jurist and politician
Nicolai Mejdell (1822–1899), Norwegian mining engineer
Peter Ludwig Mejdell Sylow (1832–1918), Norwegian mathematician
Thorvald Mejdell (1824–1908), Norwegian forester
Vilhelm Mejdell (1904–1989), Norwegian marketing agent and sports official

See also
Mijdel